Sea cucumbers are marine animals of the class Holothuroidea. They can be used as food, in fresh or dried form, in various cuisines. In some cultural contexts the sea cucumber is thought to have medicinal value.

The creature and the food product are commonly known as bêche-de-mer in French, from Portuguese bicho do mar (literally "sea animal"), trepang (or trīpang) in Indonesian, namako in Japanese, balatan in Tagalog, loli in Hawaiian and deniz patlıcanı (sea eggplant) in Turkish. In Malay, it is known as the gamat.

Most cultures in East and Southeast Asia regard sea cucumbers as a delicacy. A number of dishes are made with sea cucumber, and in most dishes it has a slippery texture. Common ingredients that go with sea cucumber dishes include winter melon, conpoy, kai-lan, shiitake mushroom, and Chinese cabbage.

Many sea cucumber species are endangered and are at risk of overfishing due to their consumption.

Harvest

Sea cucumbers destined for food are traditionally harvested by hand from small watercraft, a process called "trepanging" after the Indonesian Malay word for sea cucumber teripang. They are dried for preservation, and must be rehydrated by boiling and soaking in water for several days. They are mainly used as an ingredient in Chinese cuisine soups or stews.

Many commercially important species of sea cucumber are harvested and dried for export for use in Chinese cuisine as 海参 (pinyin: hǎishēn). Some of the more commonly found species in markets include:

Holothuria scabra (sandfish)
Holothuria arguinensis
Holothuria spinifera (brown sandfish)
Holothuria fuscogilva (bat susu, white teatfish)
Holothuria nobilis (black teatfish)
Actinopyga mauritiana (spiny sea cucumber)
Apostichopus japonicus (Japanese sea cucumber)
Parastichopus californicus (giant California sea cucumber)
Thelenota ananas (prickly redfish)
Acaudina molpadioides

Western Australia has sea cucumber fisheries from Exmouth to the border of the Northern Territory; almost all of the catch is sandfish (Holothuria scabra). The fishing of the various species known as bêche-de-mer is regulated by state and federal legislation.

Five other species are targeted in the state's bêche-de-mer harvest, these are Holothuria nobilis (black teatfish), Holothuria whitmaei (black fish), Thelenota ananas (prickly redfish), Actinopyga echninitis (deep-water redfish), and Holothuria atra (lolly fish).

In the far north of Queensland, Australia, sea cucumber are harvested from the Great Barrier Reef and the Coral Sea. Targeted species include Holothuria noblis (white teatfish), Holothuria whitmaei (black teatfish) and H. scabra (sand fish). Divers are supplied air via hose or "hookah"  from the surface and collect their catch by hand, diving to depths of up to 40 m.

Market

The trade in trepang, between Macassans seafarers and the aborigines of Arnhem Land, to supply the markets of Southern China is the first recorded example of trade between the inhabitants of the Australian continent and their Asian neighbours.

The Asian market for sea cucumber is estimated to be US$60 million. The dried form accounts for 95% of the sea cucumber traded annually in China, Singapore, Malaysia, Korea, and Japan.

It is typically used in Chinese cuisines. The biggest re-exporters in the trade are Mainland China, Hong Kong, and Singapore. Of the 650 species of sea cucumbers, just 10 species have commercial value. In 2013, the Chinese government cracked down on the purchasing of sea cucumbers by officials as their expensive price tag could be seen as a sign of opulence.

In Japan, sea cucumber is also eaten raw, as sashimi or sunomono, and its intestine is also eaten as konowata, which is salted and fermented food (a variety of shiokara).
The dried ovary of sea cucumber is also eaten, which is called konoko (このこ) or kuchiko (くちこ).

Sea cucumbers are considered non-kosher in Jewish dietary law.

Culinary use
Both a fresh form and a dried form are used for cooking, though its preparation is complex due to its taste being entirely "tasteless and bland".  In the Suiyuan shidan, the Chinese Qing Dynasty manual of gastronomy, it is stated: "As an ingredient, sea cucumbers have little to no taste, are full of sand, and are fishy in smell. For these reasons, it is also the most difficult ingredient to prepare well."(海參，無味之物，沙多氣腥，最難討好。) Much of the preparation of sea cucumber goes into cleaning and boiling it, then stewing it in meat broths and extracts to infuse each sea cucumber with flavour.

Chinese folk belief attributes male sexual health and aphrodisiac qualities to the sea cucumber, as it physically resembles a phallus, and uses a defence mechanism similar to ejaculation as it stiffens and squirts its own entrails at the aggressor. It is also considered a restorative for tendonitis and arthritis.

See also
 Bao yu
 Shark fin soup
 Buddha Jumps Over the Wall

References

External links

Holothuroidea
Japanese seafood
Indonesian cuisine
Cantonese cuisine
Hong Kong cuisine
Animal-based seafood
Korean seafood
 

ja:ナマコ#食材としてのナマコ